Macrogastra rolphii, known as Rolph’s door snail, is a species of air-breathing land snail, a terrestrial pulmonate gastropod mollusk in the family Clausiliidae, the door snails. 

The shell of this species is sinistral, or left-handed, in its coiling.

Subspecies
 Macrogastra rolphii digonostoma (Bourguignat, 1877)
 Macrogastra rolphii portensis (Luso da Silva, 1872)
 Macrogastra rolphii rolphii (W. Turton, 1826)

Distribution
This species is known to occur in Western Europe in the following islands and countries:
 Belgium
 Great Britain
 The Netherlands
 Portugal
 and others

References

  Bank, R. A.; Neubert, E. (2017). Checklist of the land and freshwater Gastropoda of Europe. Last update: July 16th, 2017.

External links
  Taylor, J. W. (1883). Descriptions of some new varieties of British land and freshwater shells. Journal of Conchology. 4: 28-37
 AnimalBase info at: 

Clausiliidae
Gastropods described in 1826